Äpy is a traditional and the oldest Finnish humour magazine published related to the Walpurgis Night festivities.

History and profile
Äpy was first published in Christmas 1948. The magazine is published in odd-numbered years by the students of Aalto University (previously called Helsinki University of Technology). It is printed extraordinarily, for instance on toilet paper and a bedsheet.

See also
Julkku

References

External links
Finnish homepage of Äpy

1948 establishments in Finland
Finnish-language magazines
Humor magazines
Magazines established in 1948
Magazines published in Helsinki
Student magazines
Walpurgis Night traditions